Astley's Amphitheatre may refer to:

Amphithéâtre Astley, Paris, France
Astley's Amphitheatre (Dublin), Ireland
Astley's Amphitheatre, London, England
Astley's Amphitheatre (Melbourne), Australia

See also
Philip Astley, founder of eponymous circus and theatre